Ballyhaise was a former junction station on the Cavan to Clones Great Northern Railway (Ireland) line six and a half miles north east of the town of Cavan. The station building and platform is still extant though in private ownership. Until 1885 it was known as Belturbet Junction.

See also 
 List of closed railway stations in Ireland: B

References 

Disused railway stations in County Cavan
Railway stations opened in 1862
Railway stations closed in 1957
1862 establishments in Ireland
1957 disestablishments in Ireland
Railway stations in the Republic of Ireland opened in the 19th century